Justice League Action is an American superhero animated television series based on the DC Comics superhero team Justice League. The series is produced by Jim Krieg, Butch Lukic, and Alan Burnett. The show debuted on Cartoon Network UK on November 26, 2016, and premiered in the United States on Cartoon Network on December 16, 2016. The first season concluded on June 3, 2018, marking an end to the series.

Plot
The series features the adventures of Superman, Batman, Wonder Woman and all the members of the Justice League as they fight various megavillains and other threats to protect Earth.

Voice cast

Crew
 Aaron Chavda – Visual FX Animation
 Wes Gleason – Casting and Voice Director
 Brett Hardin – Design and Visual FX Animation
 Shane Glines – Character Designer

Series overview
{| class="wikitable" style="text-align:center"
|+Overview of Justice League Action seasons
|-
! scope="col" colspan="2" rowspan="2"| Season
! scope="col" rowspan="2"| Episodes
! scope="col" colspan="2"| Originally aired
|-
! scope="col"| First aired
! scope="col"| Last aired
|-
 | bgcolor="#b0171f" |
 |1
 | align="center"| 52
 | align="center" width="136"| November 26, 2016 (UK)December 16, 2016 (US)
 | align="center" width="136"| June 3, 2018 (US)
|-
 | bgcolor="#b0171d" |
 |Shorts
 | align="center"| 22
 | align="center" width="136"| June 29, 2017
 | align="center" width="136"| December 21, 2017
|}

Episodes

Season 1 (2016–2018)

Justice League Action Shorts
A short-form web series, "Justice League Action Shorts", began airing on the DC Kids' YouTube channel on June 29, 2017.

Broadcast
Justice League Action premiered on Cartoon Network UK on November 26, 2016, and on Cartoon Network in the USA on December 16, 2016. Justice League Action also premiered on Cartoon Network Australia on March 18, 2017, and premiered on Cartoon Network Philippines on March 25, 2017.

Promotion
McDonald's Happy Meal toys were distributed to coincide with the show's release on September 20, 2016 in the United States only.

References

External links
 DC page
 
 

2016 American television series debuts
2018 American television series endings
2010s American animated television series
2010s American science fiction television series
American children's animated action television series
American children's animated adventure television series
American children's animated drama television series
American children's animated science fantasy television series
American children's animated superhero television series
Animated Batman television series
Animated Justice League television series
Animated Superman television series
Animated television shows based on DC Comics
Cartoon Network original programming
English-language television shows
Television series by Warner Bros. Animation
Wonder Woman in other media